Mette Lykke (born 1981 in Ringkøbing, Denmark) is a Danish businesswoman, entrepreneur and investor. Mette Lykke is the CEO of food-tech startup Too Good To Go. She was formerly co-founder and CEO of Endomondo, later acquired by Under Armour.

Early years and education 
Mette Lykke comes from a family of self-employed people. Her grandfather started the chain 10-4 in 1947, which consists of both hardware stores and timber merchants. 

Mette Lykke holds a master's degree in political science from Aarhus University.

Career 
In 2007, she co-founded the Endomondo, which was sold to Under Armour in 2015, for $85m. She then took over as VP of Connected Fitness until 2017.

In 2018, Mette Lykke was elected to the Gyldendal Board of Directors.

References 

Living people
1981 births
People from Ringkøbing-Skjern Municipality